Tree Pit is an English Rock band formed in London, England, in 2008 by Lior Seker (lead vocals and guitar), Yaron Rosenblum (drums), . All the three grew up together in Hod Hasharon, Israel and met in London.

Biography

Formation 
In the summer of 2008 the three band members worked as music Producers at a Soho based recording studio, which gave the band its initial name The Producers. They started by recording and re-recording songs trying to turn their music into a cohesive whole that melts their different worlds of Folk, Rock, Fusion and Jazz together, in order to find their unique sound.

Band members 
All three were born in the early 1980s with a real passion for music and since an early age they have been playing in different bands. Lior Seker was the singer of a progressive rock band named Eggroll. One of their many achievements was to play as the opening act for Jethro Tull on their 2008 tour. Lately he took part in a project called Ephrat which took the stages as the warm-up band for Dream Theater in their 2009 tour. Yaron Rozenblum was the drummer of an Israeli rock band Music Of Chance, which released their album Me in 2005 and the lead singer of another Israeli rock band, The Following. Rozenblum is also the drummer for the North London-based indie rock band The Playing Fields, that released two critically acclaimed albums. Nim Sadot took part in a wide spectrum of different projects, one of them is the AfroBeat band, Oziozaamusic.

Live 
Tree Pit started to explore the UK live scene in 2010, performing at the 100 Club and in well known venues such as The Good Ship, 93 Feet East, Wilmington Arms, amongst others.

Debut album 
In the end of 2010, Tree Pit started working on their debut album to be released in the summer of 2011. The recording took place in the beginning of January 2011 at Soho Studios in London and at The Sickroom in Norfolk. Producer Guy Katsav was in charge of the production/mixing of the album in collaboration with the band. Tree Pit released the first single from their debut album on 9 April 2011. An album pre release, a cover to "Eleanor Rigby", was released on 12 January 2011.

References

External links 
 Official page

English alternative rock groups
Musical groups from London